Sinecatechins (USAN, trade names Veregen and Polyphenon E) is a specific water extract of green tea leaves from Camellia sinensis that is the active ingredient in an ointment approved by the FDA in 2006 as a botanical drug to treat genital warts.  Sinecatechins are mostly catechins, 55% of which is epigallocatechin gallate.  It was the first botanical drug approved by the US FDA.

References 

Pharmaceutical industry
Botanical drugs